Technology Business Management Council is a Washington-based non-profit organization with the goal of creating and promoting “best practices for running IT as a business.” As of January 2018, the TBM Council has about 5,100 CIO, CTO, & CFO members who are advancing technology business management standards and education across all industries. Its current board of directors includes executives from AIG, Aflac, Apptio, Cisco, Dollar General, First American, Intuit, Great West Life, MasterCard, Micron, Nationwide, Red Ventures, Stanley Black & Decker, SunTrust, Tyson Foods, and the University of Pennsylvania.

History 
The TBM Council began as a biannual executive summit for CIOs sponsored by Apptio, which develops technology business management software as a service applications. In 2012, Apptio founded the TBM Council as a non-profit organization with a mission to identify and promote industry best practices for running technology organizations like a business. Upon incorporation, Apptio's Chief Marketing Officer (Chris Pick) became the president, and Chief Information Officers from Cisco (Rebecca Jacoby) and First American (Larry Godec) became co-chairs of the board of directors. In 2013, the Council held its first industry conference in Seattle and expanded its program into Europe in 2014. In 2015, the Council appointed Mike Brown, Vice President, Global Information Technology at ExxonMobil as its chairman of the board, created industry workgroups to define standards and launched a private and public sector IT COST Commission with the United States Federal Government. In 2016, the Council released their book  and concluded the year-long IT COST Commission by making 21 recommendations to improve transparency, reduce waste and increase the efficiency of IT spending within the US Government.

TBM Framework and Index 
The TBM Framework for “running IT with greater business acumen” is designed to provide “a shared decision-making model for technology and business leaders” and a structure for IT executives to have “conversations with the CEO and the board of directors about the value of IT investments.”

The TBM Council publishes an agreed-upon set of TBM best practices with the goal of helping business technology leaders benchmark their success in those practices using the TBM Index. The index follows the structure of the TBM Framework. It is an interactive survey with open participation and is published in the TBM Council's iPad ebook, Technology Business Management: How Innovative Technology Leaders Apply Business Acumen to Drive Value,  and on the TBM Council's website.

The goal of the TBM Index is to provide “an industry-validated benchmark on the state of technology business management.” The information gathered is designed to help the council understand how technology business management varies by industry, geography, and IT operating model, in order to make recommendations to companies around the world. 

The TBM Council's work has been credited with helping some enterprises identify CIOs as those “most responsible for driving digital innovation and change.” For example, Clorox Co. has been using the TBM Council's best practices and benchmarks to help establish the value of IT services and make the case for further investments in IT.

Mission/Business Outcomes 
 Strategic Alignment through service and project portfolio management
 Value Delivery through portfolio, financial, and asset tracking
 Performance Measurement through metrics and reporting
 Resource Management through labor, software, and hardware tracking
 Risk and Compliance Management through policies, procedures, and contracts tracking

Stakeholder Support 

 TBM Stakeholder Support
 CIO
 Application Owner
 Infrastructure & Operations
 CFO

Process Integration 

 IT Financial Management
 IT Service Portfolio Management
 Asset Management
 IT Project & Portfolio Management
 IT Infrastructure Management
 Vendor & Contract Management

Board of Directors and CE 
The TBM Council's founding board of directors include Mike Benson, executive vice president and CIO of DirecTV; Tim Campos, CIO of Facebook; Don Duet, co-head technology division, Goldman Sachs; Sunny Gupta, CEO of Apptio; Rebecca Jacoby, CIO of Cisco; Ralph Loura, senior vice president, Clorox Co.;  Tom Murphy, CIO, University of Pennsylvania (and former CIO of AmerisourceBergen); Jim Scholefield, CTO, The Coca-Cola Company; Robert Webb, CITO, Etihad Airways (and former CIO of Hilton); and Carol Zierhoffer, CIO of Xerox.

Research 
In 2013, the TBM Council commissioned Forrester Consulting to research the impact of business imperatives on the metrics CIOs use to convey the performance and contribution of technologies toward meeting business goals. The research found that most business leaders don't understand what IT departments do and don't know what the IT budget is or how the IT department's success is measured. Most business leaders surveyed said that IT departments had a 60% bigger budget than they actually did. CIOs said they spend 5% of the organization's revenue, but business leaders thought it was 8% of revenue.

TBM Conference 
In 2010, the TBM Council held its first virtual TBM Summit, with approximately 100 CIOs and IT leaders participating. The TBM Council held its first conference in November 2013 in Seattle, attended by approximately 400 IT leaders. At the conference, eBay received the council's first Operational Excellence Award, given to organizations that employ “internal and external IT transparency to improve the cost-effectiveness of the services IT delivers to the wider organization.” The second conference is scheduled for October 2014 in Miami Beach.

References

External links 
 Official site

Technology organizations